Ends is a collection of science fiction stories and poems by American writer Gordon R. Dickson.  It was first published by Baen Books in 1988 and as a companion volume to Dickson's Beginnings.  Most of the stories originally appeared in the magazines Analog Science Fiction and Fact, Astounding, If, Galaxy Science Fiction, Destinies, Science Fiction Stories and Amazing Stories  The poems first appeared in The Final Encyclopedia.

Contents

 Foreword
 "A Outrance"
 "Computers Don’t Argue"
 "By New Hearth Fires"
 "Ancient, My Enemy"
 "Turnabout"
 "An Honorable Death"
 "Lost Dorsai"
 "Last Voyage"
 "Call Him Lord"
 "And Then There Was Peace"
 "Whatever Gods There Be"
 "Minotaur"
 "Enter a Pilgrim"
 "Armageddon"

References

1988 short story collections
Short story collections by Gordon R. Dickson
American poetry collections